The People's Party (Narodna) is a centre-right political party in Serbia. It is led by Vuk Jeremić.

Narodna was formed in October 2017 after Jeremić re-organised the People's Movement of Serbia, a political party led by Miroslav Aleksić. It cooperated with Dragan Đilas and the Movement of Free Citizens and Serbian Left, with whom Narodna took part in the 2018 Belgrade City Assembly election and won 19% of the popular vote. Narodna then joined the Alliance for Serbia (SZS), a coalition formed by Đilas, which organised mass anti-government protests after the attack on Borko Stefanović in November 2018. Together with SZS, Narodna boycotted the 2020 parliamentary election, claiming that its conditions would not be free and fair. Narodna was later a member of the United Opposition of Serbia, which existed between August 2020 and January 2021, and then the United for the Victory of Serbia (UZPS) coalition. 

With UZPS, it took part in the 2022 general elections and nominated Zdravko Ponoš, then-member of Narodna, as their presidential candidate. Ponoš lost the presidential election while Narodna won 12 seats in the National Assembly, although due to conflicts between Narodna and the Party of Freedom and Justice (SSP), UZPS dissolved after the elections. Since then, Narodna formed its own parliamentary groups in the National Assembly and City Assembly of Belgrade and has remained critical of SSP, while still serving in opposition to the Serbian Progressive Party. Narodna is a liberal-conservative party, and although nominally supportive of the accession of Serbia to the European Union, it possesses Eurosceptic positions and declares itself to be in favour of military neutrality.

History

Formation 
Following his unsuccessful bid in an attempt to replace Ban Ki-moon as United Nations Secretary-General in late 2016, Vuk Jeremić announced in January 2017 that he would run in the April 2017 Serbian presidential election. Jeremić won 5.7% of the popular vote and placed fourth in the presidential election. After the election, Jeremić announced in June 2017 the formation of a political party which he said "would be positioned on the centre-right on the political spectrum". Jeremić received support from Dijana Vukomanović, a former member of the Socialist Party of Serbia, and Siniša Kovačević, a playwright. Miroslav Aleksić, the leader of the People's Movement of Serbia, offered Jeremić to not form a party, but to re-organise his instead under a different name. Jeremić accepted this and announced that the founding assembly would be held on 22 October 2017. At the founding assembly, Jeremić was elected president of the People's Party (Narodna), while Aleksić was elected as first vice-president and Kovačević, Sanda Rašković Ivić, Svetozar Čiplić, Zdravko Ponoš, and Nikola Jovanović were elected vice-presidents of the party. Narodna also gained three seats in the National Assembly, with Aleksić, Rašković Ivić, and Vukomanović serving as its representatives.

2017–2019 
Following the formation, Narodna began cooperating with the Movement of Free Citizens (PSG), a political organisation led by Saša Janković. Together with PSG and the Serbian Left (LS), Narodna announced in January 2018 that Dragan Đilas would be their joint mayoral candidate for the 2018 Belgrade City Assembly election. The coalition ended up placing second and won 19% of the popular vote; Narodna won 5 seats in the City Assembly of Belgrade. Following the election, Đilas proposed the idea of creating an opposition alliance with a collective leadership; Narodna supported this proposal. This was initially realised in the City Assembly of Belgrade, when Narodna, LS and the group led by Đilas formed the Alliance for Serbia (SZS) in May 2018, however on national level, SZS was formalised in September 2018. After the attack on the leader of LS, Borko Stefanović, in November 2018, SzS organised mass anti-government protests.

In January 2019, Narodna, as well as other members of SZS, announced that they would boycott the sessions of the National Assembly, claiming that the National Assembly has no legitimacy due to the obstruction of the government over the opposition by allegedly violating the rules of the National Assembly, laws, and the Constitution. Additionally, Rašković Ivić announced that Narodna would boycott the 2020 parliamentary election; this was also announced by SZS in September 2019. They claimed that the election would not be free and fair. At the party assembly in November 2019, Jeremić was re-elected president of Narodna, while the incumbent vice-presidents, except Čiplić who was replaced by Borislav Novaković, were also re-elected.

2020–present 
The mass protests which began in 2018 formally ended in March 2020 due to the proclamation of the COVID-19 pandemic in Serbia. Following the 2020 parliamentary election, SZS was dissolved, while vice-president Jovanović left Narodna. This coalition was transformed into the United Opposition of Serbia (UOPS) in August 2020, in which Narodna also took part. In September 2020, Narodna chose Ponoš as their representative for the upcoming Belgrade City Assembly election, although he later rejected this offer. UOPS was unstable and conflicts between Narodna and the Party of Freedom and Justice, a political party led by Đilas, occurred inside the coalition. Narodna also opposed the move of SSP and the Democratic Party (DS) to form a joint platform with PSG for the inter-party dialogues on electoral conditions, considering that PSG did not boycott the 2020 parliamentary election. This led to the dissolution of UOPS, which Narodna confirmed in January 2021. Additionally, Narodna presented its platform for the inter-party dialogues on electoral conditions with the Civic Platform, Movement of Free Serbia, and Slobodan Samardžić. The dialogues lasted from July to October 2021. During this period, SSP and Narodna renewed their cooperation and subsequently announced that they would take part in a joint coalition for the 2022 general election.

Narodna opposed the proposed constitutional changes which were voted on a referendum in January 2022. A month later, the coalition between Narodna, SSP, DS, and PSG was formalised under the name United for the Victory of Serbia (UZPS); the coalition nominated Ponoš as their presidential candidate and Vladeta Janković as their mayoral candidate for the 2022 Belgrade City Assembly election. UZPS campaigned on forming technocratic teams, an anti-corruption body, lustration and transparency. In the parliamentary election, the coalition won 14% of the popular vote, while Narodna won 12 seats in the National Assembly. In the presidential election, Ponoš placed second and won 18% of the popular vote, while in the Belgrade City Assembly election, the UZPS coalition won 21% of the popular vote; Narodna won 6 seats. Following the election, Ponoš left Narodna, while UZPS disintegrated. Narodna criticised the meeting between Đilas and Aleksandar Vučić that occurred shortly after the elections, and in response Marinika Tepić accused Narodna of populism. Following the elections, Narodna remained in opposition and formed their own parliamentary groups in the City Assembly of Belgrade and National Assembly of Serbia. It has also remained critical of PSG and SSP.

Ideology and platform 
At the founding assembly in October 2017, Narodna stated its support for "military neutrality, independent institutions, depoliticisation of the Security Intelligence Agency, and the adoption of the law on lustration". Shortly after the founding assembly, Rašković Ivić also defined Narodna as "centrist", stating that it combines conservative views, as well as support for rule of law and workers' rights. In its political programme, Narodna stated its support for "political revanchism towards members and helpers of Vučić". It serves in opposition to the ruling Serbian Progressive Party.

Narodna is positioned on the centre-right on the political spectrum. Dušan Spasojević, a professor at the Faculty of Political Sciences of University of Belgrade, noted that following the dissolution of SZS, Narodna has shifted more to the right. Ideologically, Narodna has been described as a liberal-conservative and a conservative party. Narodna began as a pro-European party and it remains nominally supportive of the accession of Serbia to the European Union, although it has shifted to more Eurosceptic positions. It has been also described as a less "European Union enthusiastic party". Rašković Ivić stated that she remained an Eurosceptic after becoming vice-president of Narodna, while Jeremić remained orientated towards pro-Europeanism. Gajić, one of the current vice-presidents of Narodna, has criticised the European Union, claiming that it leads an "imperialist policy in the Balkans". Following the 2022 Russian invasion of Ukraine, Narodna has voiced its opposition to sanctioning Russia. It is also opposed to the recognition of Kosovo, and together with Dveri, New Democratic Party of Serbia (NDSS), and Serbian Party Oathkeepers (SSZ) parties, it signed a joint declaration for the "reintegration of Kosovo into the constitutional and legal order of Serbia" in October 2022. However since then, Narodna has remained on the sideline, while Dveri, NDSS, SSZ, and Movement for the Restoration of the Kingdom of Serbia began cooperating more intensively, despite their similar positions regarding Kosovo.

In June 2021, Narodna stated that the electoral threshold should be raised to 10%, claiming that "we would then know who would be in the government and who would be in the opposition". It has also stated its opposition to Rio Tinto, an Anglo-Australian mining company, and its Project Jadar. Narodna opposed the manifestation of 2022 EuroPride in Belgrade. In the Parliamentary Assembly of the Council of Europe, Narodna is represented by Stefan Jovanović, who does not sit in any group.

Organisation 
Narodna is led by its co-founder Vuk Jeremić, who was most recently re-elected in 2021. Its current vice-presidents are Novaković, Aleksić, Rašković Ivić, Kovačević, Vladimir Gajić, Marina Lipovac Tanasković and Đorđe Stanković, while Jovanović serves as the party's general-secretary. Aleksić also serves as the party's parliamentary leader. Its headquarters are located at Njegoшева 76, Belgrade. Narodna has a youth wing named the Youth of the People's Party, and a women's wing named Women's Network. In May 2021, Narodna claimed that it had around 13,000 registered members.

List of presidents

Electoral performance

Parliamentary elections

Presidential elections

Provincial elections

Belgrade City Assembly elections

References

External links 

 
 

Liberal conservative parties
Conservative parties in Serbia
Political parties established in 2017
2017 establishments in Serbia
Pro-European political parties in Serbia
Centre-right parties in Europe
Eurosceptic parties in Serbia